Cremat, or rom cremat (Catalan for 'burnt rum') is an alcoholic cocktail of Catalan origin. Although many different recipes exist, the common elements to most of them are rum, sugar, spices (particularly cinnamon), lemon peel, and some form of coffee (usually roasted beans, but soluble instant coffee or brewed coffee are also used).

History
The origin of the cremat is closely related to historic seatrade between Catalonia and the Americas (particularly Cuba) in the 19th century, at a time when Catalan tradesmen and entrepreneurs set sail for the West Indies in search of fortune (an archetype known in Catalonia as indià or indiano upon their return).. The drink is associated with fishermen and believed to have originated on the Costa Brava, the coastal area of Girona.

Popularity and significance
Preparation and consumption of cremat constitutes an important part in the ritual of singing havaneres, a musical genre based on Cuban contradanza. This type of sea shanty, and by extension the drink, is a staple of Catalan identity. A concert or cantada of havaneres is a frequent night event in village festivals (festes majors) around Catalonia, not exclusively on the seaside, and cremat is served to both singers and audiences.

Preparation
Cremat is traditionally brewed in a large terracotta bowl or pot. Dark rum is preferred, although since most of the alcohol is burned away, it is not necessary to use a top shelf brand. The rum is mixed with sugar, cinnamon, a lemon peel, and roasted coffee beans, and heated over a stove so that the sugar melts. At this point it can be tasted for sweetness and add sugar if necessary. Then it is put out by covering the bowl with a lid, blowing, or throwing brewed coffee on it.

It is then served hot in glasses or coffee mugs.

See also 
 List of cocktails

References 

Catalan cuisine
Catalan folklore
Cocktails with rum
Alcoholic coffee drinks